Guangxi is an autonomous region of China.

Guangxi may also refer to Chinese era names used by several emperors of China:
Guangxi (光熹, 189), era name used by Liu Bian, emperor of the Han dynasty
Guangxi (光熙, 306), era name used by Emperor Hui of Jin

See also
Guanxi or connections, Chinese sociological concept